"If You Don't Want Me to Destroy You" is the fourth single, and the last to be taken from the album Fuzzy Logic, by Super Furry Animals. It reached #18 on the UK Singles Chart on its release in September 1996.

The band spent their promotional budget for this single on a tank. The band had the tank painted bright blue and used it to arrive at music festivals. A photograph of the tank is featured on the cover of this single, with the title painted on the tank gun barrel. The tank was later sold to Don Henley.

The packaging of the single features a quote in Welsh, 'Bydded Mae sawl ffordd i gael Wil i'w wely', which roughly translates into English as 'There's more than one way to get Will to bed'.

B-side "(Nid) Hon Yw'r Gân Sy'n Mynd I Achub Yr Iaith" translates in English as "This Is (Not) The Song That Will Save The Welsh Language"

"The Man Don't Give a Fuck" was originally intended to be released as a B-side on the "If You Don't Want Me to Destroy You" single, however Steely Dan frontman Donald Fagen refused to clear a sample of the track "Show Biz Kids" which features prominently on the track and it was replaced by "Guacamole".

Critical response

Accolades

Track listing

All songs by Super Furry Animals.
CD (CRESCD243)
"If You Don't Want Me to Destroy You" – 3:18
"Guacamole" – 4:04
"(Nid) Hon Yw'r Gân Sy'n Mynd I Achub Yr Iaith" – 3:54
Promo CD (CRESCD243P)
"If You Don't Want Me to Destroy You" – 3:18
"The Man Don't Give a Fuck" – 4:04
"(Nid) Hon Yw'r Gân Sy'n Mynd I Achub Yr Iaith" – 3:54

Personnel
Gruff Rhys – vocals, guitar
Huw Bunford – guitar, backing vocals
Guto Pryce – bass guitar
Cian Ciaran – keyboards, backing vocals
Dafydd Ieuan – drums
 Matthew Everett – violin
 Chris Williams – violin
 Helen Spargo – viola
 Catherine Tanner – cello

Singles chart positions

References

Super Furry Animals songs
Creation Records singles
1996 singles
1996 songs